The International Meeting of Communist and Workers' Parties (IMCWP) is an annual conference attended by communist and workers' parties from several countries. It originated in 1998 when the Communist Party of Greece (KKE) invited communist and workers' parties to participate in an annual conference where parties could gather to share their experiences and issue a joint declaration. The most recent and 22nd meeting of the IMCWP was held in October 2022 in Havana and hosted by the Communist Party of Cuba. The meeting was attended by delegates from 51 parties.

Organization 
The Working Group (WG) of International Meeting of Communist and Workers' Parties (IMCWP) is composed of Communist Parties throughout the world. The task of the working group is to prepare and organize the International Meetings of Communist and Workers' Parties (IMCWPs).

The meetings are held annually, with participants from all around the globe. Additionally, there are occasionally extraordinary meetings such as the meeting in Damascus in September 2009 on "Solidarity with the heroic struggle of the Palestinian people and the other people in Middle East". In December 2009, the communist and workers' parties agreed to the creation of the International Communist Review, which is published annually in English and Spanish and has a website.

Participation 
The following table is a list of participants in each meeting.

Key:
✓ = participated
– = did not participate
o = observer
m = sent message

Representatives

Extraordinary TeleConference, 2021 
Due to the COVID-19 pandemic, delegates to the International Meeting of Communist and Workers' Parties did not meet in 2020. However, a virtual meeting was held over Zoom on 10 and 11 December 2021.

21st International meeting, 2019 
The 21st International Meeting of Communist and Workers' Parties, with the theme "100th anniversary of the founding of the Communist International. The fight for peace and socialism continues", took place in Izmir, Turkey, from 18 to 20 October 2019, and was hosted by the Communist Party of Turkey and the Communist Party of Greece.

20th International meeting, 2018 
The 20th International Meeting of Communist and Workers' Parties, with the theme "The contemporary working class and its alliance. The tasks of its political vanguard – the Communist and Worker’s Parties – in the struggle against exploitation and imperialist wars, for the rights of the workers and of the peoples, for peace, for socialism", took place in Athens, Greece, from 23 to 25 November 2018.

19th International Meeting, 2017

The 19th International Meeting of Communist and Workers' Parties, with the theme "The 100th Anniversary of the Great October Socialist Revolution:the ideals of the Communist Movement, revitalizing the struggle against imperialistic wars, for peace, socialism", took place in St. Petersburg, Russia, from 2 to 3 November 2017 and in Moscow, Russia, from 5 to 7 November 2017.

18th International Meeting, 2016

The 18th International Meeting of Communist and Workers' Parties took place in Hanoi, Vietnam, from 28 to 30 October 2016.

17th International Meeting, 2015

The 17th International Meeting of Communist and Workers' Parties took place in Istanbul, Turkey, from 30 October to 1 November 2015.

16th International Meeting, 2014

The 16th International Meeting of Communist and Workers' Parties took place from 13 to 15 November 2014 in Guayaquil, Ecuador. It was attended by 85 delegates representing 53 parties from 44 countries.

15th International Meeting, 2013

The 15th International Meeting of Communist and Workers' Parties took place from 8 to 10 November 2013 in Lisbon, Portugal.

14th International Meeting, 2012

The 14th International Meeting of Communist and Workers' Parties took place from 22 to 25 November 2012 in Beirut, Lebanon.

13th International Meeting, 2011

The 13th meeting was held in Athens, Greece, from 9 to 11 December 2011 and was hosted by the Communist Party of Greece (KKE). Under the motto "Socialism is the future!", it was attended by 80 parties, while additional eight parties sent a message.

12th International Meeting, 2010

The 13th meeting was held in Johannesburg, South Africa, from 3 to 5 December 2010 and was hosted by the South African Communist Party.

11th International Meeting, 2009

The 11th meeting was held in New Delhi, India, from 20 to 22 November 2009 and was hosted by both the Communist Party of India (Marxist) and the Communist Party of India. It was attended by 89 participants representing 57 communist and workers' parties and 48 countries.

10th International Meeting, 2008

The 10th meeting was held in São Paulo, Brazil, from 21 to 23 November 2008 and was hosted by the Communist Party of Brazil (PCdoB). It was attended by delegations of 65 communist and workers' parties from 55 countries.

9th International Meeting, 2007

The 9th meeting was held in Minsk, Belarus, from 3 to 5 November 2007 and was hosted by the Communist Party of Belarus (KPB). It was attended by 154 representatives of 72 communist and workers' parties, representing 59 countries.

See also 
 World Federation of Democratic Youth
International Communist Seminar
Communist International
Communist Information Bureau
Council for Mutual Economic Assistance
 Political international

Notes

References

External links 
 Solidarity Network of Communist and Workers' Parties
 Information Bulletin 
 International Communist Review 

Communist organizations
Left-wing internationals
Political conferences